The Chamberlain Manganese Deposits are located in the north of the United States near Chamberlain, South Dakota. The Chamberlain Deposits represent one of the largest manganese reserves in the United States having estimated reserves of 2 billion tonnes of manganese ore grading 0.6% manganese metal.  Although abundant, the grade is so low a concentration that recovery of manganese is not possible.

References 

Manganese
Brule County, South Dakota